Man of the House may refer to:

Film and television 
 Man of the House (1995 film), a comedy starring Chevy Chase and Jonathan Taylor Thomas
 Man of the House (2005 film), a film starring Tommy Lee Jones
 Man of the House (TV series), a 2007 Singaporean Chinese modern family drama
 "Man of the House" (House), an episode of House

Other media 
 "Man of the House" (song), by Chuck Wicks, 2009
 Man of the House, a 1987 autobiography by Tip O'Neill
 The Man of the House, a 1996 novel by Stephen McCauley

See also
 A Man About the House (disambiguation)
 A Man in the House, a 1940 film